Sebastiania heteroica is a species of flowering plant in the family Euphorbiaceae. It was described in 1874. It is native to Rio de Janeiro, Brazil.

References

Plants described in 1874
Flora of Brazil
heteroica
Taxa named by Johannes Müller Argoviensis